The Monster Project is a 2017 American horror film directed by Victor Mathieu and starring Justin Bruening and Toby Hemingway.

Plot

Devon (Justin Bruening) is an up-and-coming youtuber who makes fake videos about monster appearances with his cameraman Jamal (Jamal Quezarie). He has the idea of creating a series on his channel to find and interview real monsters by placing an ad on Craigslist. The pair find three candidates to film for the channel: Steven (Steven Flores), a police officer who claims to be a skinwalker; Shayla (Yvonne Zima), a mysterious tattoo artist who claims to be a vampire, and Shiori (Shiori Ideta), a young Asian girl who claims to be tormented by demonic possessions. Bryan (Toby Hemingway), Jamal's childhood friend, is spending time at Jamal's house in recovery from drug addiction. Devon hires his ex-girlfriend/Bryan's crush, Murielle (Murielle Zuker), to direct his documentary and Bryan to be her assistant. The team rents an abandoned house to gather the creatures. It is revealed by the property owner that satanic rituals have taken place there in the past, which does not intimidate Devon.

After starting to install their equipment in the house, Devon shows some artifacts linked to the mythology of each monster, with the intention of using them if necessary. They are shooting on the night of a lunar eclipse. The interviews happen, but things start to go wrong when Shayla reveals that Bryan is still using drugs, sparking a fight among the group. When Steven disappears and the eclipse occurs, they hear low growls and investigate until they find a Steven already turned in a room. The skinwalker attacks them until they lock him in a room, injuring Jamal in the process.

They have a brief encounter with Shiori being possessed by the demon before they flee from her towards the attic. Shayla appears in her vampire form and attacks Murielle, biting her neck and taking her to the attic quickly. Jamal saves them from an attack, fatally impaling Shayla with a stake through the heart. After seeing that all the doors and windows are supernaturally locked and the skinwalker is free to attack them, the group hides in the basement. Discovering that Shiori is there, not in her demonic form, they urgently try to find a way out before she gets possessed again. Bryan eventually manages to find a way out, but is stopped by a goat skull-masked shadow in front of him. Shiori is possessed again and attacks Bryan before being restrained and an exorcism is performed. When the demon temporarily possesses Murielle, he reveals his name: Baphomet. Shiori is killed on the pentagram and Jamal begins to feel sick from the wound that seems to be getting worse and worse. The skinwalker reappears and Jamal, believing death to be near, sacrifices himself while the rest flee the basement.

Murielle and Bryan lock themselves in a room, becoming separated from Devon. Murielle begins to feel sick and vomit blood, where she gradually transforms into a vampire. Bryan is attacked by her, but he manages to kill her with a stake through her head in self-defense. He manages to escape the house when he is thrown off the second floor by the skinwalker and takes refuge in an abandoned cabin nearby. He discovers several strange symbols and monitors that are recording everything that happened in the house that night. The skinwalker invades the place, but is impaled by a spear Bryan found, and dies. It is then revealed that Devon planned all this, as he is participating in a demonic sect and the goat-headed creature is a fantasy of one of the members of the evil group. Bryan is tied to a chair and forced by Devon to participate in a ritual to summon the Antichrist. The bodies of Steven, Shayla, and Shiori and their victims are on a pentagram with Bryan. After giving his blood to the ritual, a shadow with horns and wings appears from the wall, roaring loudly and knocking over the camera which stops recording. The camera briefly flashes back on and Bryan is revealed to be a vampire, having been bitten when attacked by Murielle.

Cast
Justin Bruening as Devon
Toby Hemingway as Bryan
Murielle Zuker as Murielle
Jamal Quezaire as Jamal
Yvonne Zima as Shayla / Vampire
Steven Flores as Steven / Skinwalker
Shiori Ideta as Shiori / Demon
Jim Storm as Richard
Susan Stangl as Martha

Reception
The film has a 60% rating on Rotten Tomatoes.

References

External links
 
 

2017 horror films
American monster movies
Films scored by Pinar Toprak
Found footage films
2010s English-language films
2010s monster movies
2010s American films